John Parsons O'Donnell (July 23, 1896 in Somerville, Massachusetts–December 17, 1961 at Georgetown University in Washington, D.C.) was an American political journalist and analyst known for working for the New York Daily News.

Early life and education
The son of a doctor, O'Donnell graduated from Tufts College in 1920 with a B.A. degree. He then did graduate work at Harvard University and Dijon University.

Career
O'Donnell served as an infantry lieutenant in World War I. In 1923, he became a reporter and assistant city editor at the New York American, a post he held until 1927, when he joined the New York Daily News. After others noticed his knack for political journalism, he was assigned to report on Franklin D. Roosevelt's 1932 presidential inauguration. In 1939, after World War II broke out, he became a correspondent for the Daily News; in this capacity he spent time with the British military's forces on the Maginot line in France. O'Donnell followed his publisher's turn from admiration to intense criticism of President Roosevelt. In 1942, Roosevelt gave an Iron Cross to Earl Godwin, whereupon he asked that it be given to O'Donnell. Roosevelt cited O'Donnell's reporting on former White House correspondent George Durno (viewed by other reporters as the President's favorite) as the reason for this gesture, which was criticized by the Chicago Tribune as a "new low in vilification".

According to an Army history, even with its hasty retraction, O'Donnell's June 8, 1943 "Capitol Stuff" column did "incalculable damage" to the Women's Army Corps, thwarting recruiting efforts in war time. That column began, "Contraceptives and prophylactic equipment will be furnished to members of the WAACS, according to a super secret agreement reached by the high ranking officers of the War Department and the WAAC chieftain, Mrs. William Pettus Hobby…." This followed O'Donnell's June 7 column discussing efforts of women journalists and congresswomen to dispel "the gaudy stories of the gay and careless way in which the young ladies in uniform … disport themselves…." Although the allegations were refuted, the "fat was in the fire. The morals of the WAACs became a topic of general discussion…." Denials of O'Donnell's fabrications and others like them were ineffectual. According to Mattie Treadwell's Army history, as long as three years after O'Donnell's column, "religious publications were still to be found reprinting the story, and actually attributing the columnist's lines to Director Hobby. Director Hobby's picture was labeled 'Astounding Degeneracy' …."

On Oct. 3, 1945, O'Donnell wrote in his column that Gen. George S. Patton had been removed from his Army command in Bavaria thanks to "the secret and astoundingly effective might of this republic's foreign-born political leaders -- such as Justice of the Supreme Court Felix Frankfurter of Vienna,  White House administrative assistant Dave (Devious Dave) Niles, alias Neyhaus, and the Latvian ex-rabbinical student now known as Sidney Hillman." O'Donnell claimed that this pressure came about because the soldier whom Patton had slapped two years earlier, Charles H. Kuehl, was Jewish, and Patton allegedly used antisemitic epithets while slapping him. In fact, Kuehl was not Jewish, nor was another soldier whom Patton slapped that same month, Paul G. Bennett. All of the officials named denied any involvement in Patton's removal, and Patton himself denied ever making statements "denigrating any soldier's religion." Days later, O'Donnell was forced to retract the column, writing: "On the evidence, our statements in Capitol Stuff were untrue." Numerous advertisers boycotted the Daily News over O'Donnell's blatantly anti-Jewish language.

Personal life
O'Donnell married and divorced three times. His second marriage, in 1930, was to fellow journalist Doris Fleeson; their daughter, Doris, was born two years later. O'Donnell and Fleeson divorced in 1942, after their political views had begun to diverge. During his marriage to Fleeson, he worked with her on a column called "Capitol Stuff". He died on December 17, 1961 at Georgetown University Hospital.

Notes

References

 
  – full text; the standard scholarly history

1896 births
1961 deaths
20th-century American journalists
American male journalists
American political journalists
New York Daily News people
Tufts University alumni
People from Somerville, Massachusetts
Journalistic hoaxes